Skin in the Game may refer to:

Skin in the game (phrase), a phrase used by investors
Skin in the Game (book), a book by Nassim Nicholas Taleb
Skin in the Game (EP), 2011 EP by Canadian hard rock band Helix
The title of Season 13 Episode 22 of CSI: Crime Scene Investigation

See also
Skin Game (disambiguation)
Skins game, a type of scoring for various sports
The Skin Game (disambiguation)